UCU or Ucu may stand for:

Institutions and organizations
Universal Concepts Unlimited New York City art gallery (2000-2006)
Uganda Christian University, church-based university near Kampala, Uganda
Ukrainian Catholic University, Catholic university in Lviv, Ukraine
University College Utrecht, international Honors College of Utrecht University, Netherlands
Urdaneta City University in the Philippines
University and College Union, trade union for further-education and higher-education workers in the UK
University Credit Union, a credit union in Massachusetts
University Christian Union, Christian houses at the University of Washington.

People
Ucu Agustin (born 1976), Indonesian journalist, writer, and documentary filmmaker

Biology
UCU, a codon for the amino acid serine